The kids' table may refer to:

 Kids' table, a table at a gathering set aside for children or junior members of an organization
 The Kid Table, a 2010 novel by Andrea Siegel
 Big D and the Kids Table, a ska punk band